James Louis Bosio (born 24 September 1991) is a futsal coach and former professional footballer. Mainly a defensive midfielder, he was able to play at left-back or centre-back in a career that saw him play at Glacis United, Europa, Lincoln Red Imps and Gibraltar United, alongside loan spells in England with Ashford United and Canterbury City. Born in the Republic of Ireland, he earned 12 caps for the Gibraltar national team.

Club career
Bosio became Gibraltar's first captain in the UEFA Europa League when College Europa took on FC Vaduz of Liechtenstein in July 2014. He was part of the Lincoln Red Imps F.C. squad that made history by qualifying for the second round of the UEFA Champions League for the first time in July 2015. In 2016 he joined Gibraltar United, where he served as vice-captain. After Gibraltar United folded in 2019, he rejoined Lincoln Red Imps to play for their under-23 side in the Gibraltar Intermediate League, while he recovers from an ACL injury he suffered in October 2018. He also assisted the development of youth players in the team. In February 2021, he rejoined Glacis United. However, he retired from football at the end of the season.

He is currently a teacher in Gibraltar after completing his teacher training at Canterbury Christ Church University where he was awarded an Elite Sport Scholarship. He also serves as co-president and coach of Bavaria F.C.C.'s futsal team, and in 2019 joined the coaching staff of the Gibraltar women's futsal team. He is also a player for his futsal team as a player manager.

International career
Bosio was eligible to represent either Gibraltar or the Republic of Ireland at international level. He decided to pledge his allegiance to Gibraltar and made his debut in their 4–0 defeat to Croatia in Varazdin on 6 June 2015 and his competitive debut against world champions Germany in the UEFA Euro 2016 Qualifiers a week later.

Bosio made his first competitive start for Gibraltar against Greece in the FIFA World Cup 2018 Qualifiers in September 2016.

Career statistics

References

External links
 
 
 
 
 gibraltarfa.com Gibraltar FA Website
 pitchero.com Canterbury City Player Profile

1991 births
Living people
Gibraltarian footballers
Gibraltar international footballers
Association footballers from Dublin (city)
Republic of Ireland association footballers
Association football defenders
Ashford United F.C. players
Canterbury City F.C. players
Europa F.C. players
Gibraltar United F.C. players
Home Farm F.C. players
Lincoln Red Imps F.C. players
Glacis United F.C. players
Gibraltar Premier Division players
Gibraltarian expatriate sportspeople in England
Irish expatriate sportspeople in England
Irish expatriate association footballers
Gibraltarian expatriate footballers
Expatriate footballers in England